Groupe de Recherches et d'Echanges Technologiques (GRET) (French, Group For Research and Technology Exchanges) is a non-governmental association supporting international cooperation, professional solidarity and poverty reduction in the countries of Asia, Africa, Europe and Latin America. It was established in the late 1970s.

Its activities include implementation of field projects, expertise, studies, research, running information and exchange networks. The main spheres of attention are:
 Access to Essential Services
 Sustainable Food and Agriculture
 Institutional Development, Actors, Territories
 Information and Communication for Development
 Microfinance and Small Enterprise
 Public Policies and International Regulations.

The Association is financed mainly by the European Union, the World Bank, the French Ministry of Foreign Affairs, the French Development Agency and also by the Asian Development Bank, Unicef, USAID and many others. The turnover in 2004 was 12,901,040 euro, of which about 40% was spent on Africa and the Indian Ocean and 15% on Asia.

References

This article is related to the List of non-governmental organizations in Vietnam.

Charities based in France